Cronopio is an extinct genus of small insectivorous mammal known from the early Late Cretaceous of the Río Negro region in Argentina. Its only species is Cronopio dentiacutus. It belongs to the Meridiolestida, an extinct group of mammals widespread in South America during the Late Cretaceous, which are more closely related to modern marsupials and placental mammals than to monotremes.

Description
Cronopio is known from the holotype MPCA PV 454, a partial skull around 27mm long which is missing the skull roof, basicranium and squamosals and from the referred specimens MPCA PV 450, a partial left lower jaw with damaged teeth and MPCA PV 453, an incomplete skull with a relatively complete right lower jaw missing some teeth. All specimens were collected in La Buitrera locality, from the Candeleros Formation of the Neuquén Group, dating to the early Cenomanian stage of the early Late Cretaceous, about 99.6-96 million years ago.

Paleontologist Guillermo Rougier commented on the creature's "superficial" resemblance to the fictional character Scrat in the Ice Age franchise created  by Chris Wedge, saying "it just goes to show how diverse ancient mammals are, that we can just imagine some bizarre critter and later find something just like it."

Etymology
Cronopio was first named by Guillermo W. Rougier, Sebastián Apesteguía and Leandro C. Gaetano in 2011 and the type species is C. dentiacutus. The generic name is named after the fictional characters appearing in the work of Argentinian writer Julio Cortázar. The specific name is derived from Latin, meaning "sharp-toothed".

Phylogeny 
Cladogram following the analysis of Rougier, Wible, Beck and Apesteguía (2012):

References 

Dryolestida
Late Cretaceous mammals
Cenomanian life
Cretaceous mammals of South America
Late Cretaceous tetrapods of South America
Cretaceous Argentina
Fossils of Argentina
Candeleros Formation
Fossil taxa described in 2011